Herbert Baddeley and Wilfred Baddeley defeated Harry Barlow and C. H. Martin 5–7, 7–5, 4–6, 6–3, 8–6 in the all comers' final to win the gentlemen's doubles tennis title at the 1894 Wimbledon Championships. The reigning champions Joshua Pim and Frank Stoker did not defend their title.

Draw

All Comers'

References

External links

Gentlemen's Doubles
Wimbledon Championship by year – Men's doubles